Apolinar Paniagua (born 23 July 1946) is a Paraguayan former footballer. He played in 18 matches for the Paraguay national football team from 1975 to 1977. He was also part of Paraguay's squad for the 1975 Copa América tournament.

References

External links
 
 

1946 births
Living people
Paraguayan footballers
Paraguay international footballers
Association football forwards
People from Paraguarí Department